The 2022 German motorcycle Grand Prix (officially known as the Liqui Moly Motorrad Grand Prix Deutschland) was the tenth round of the 2022 Grand Prix motorcycle racing season. It was held at the Sachsenring in Hohenstein-Ernstthal on 19 June 2022.

Qualifying

MotoGP

Race

MotoGP

 Álex Rins withdrew from the event due to the effects of a shoulder injury suffered at the previous round in Barcelona.

Moto2

Moto3

Championship standings after the race
Below are the standings for the top five riders, constructors, and teams after the round.

MotoGP

Riders' Championship standings

Constructors' Championship standings

Teams' Championship standings

Moto2

Riders' Championship standings

Constructors' Championship standings

Teams' Championship standings

Moto3

Riders' Championship standings

Constructors' Championship standings

Teams' Championship standings

References

External links

2022 MotoGP race reports
motorcycle Grand Prix
2022
motorcycle Grand Prix